Douglas McArthur Jarvis (born March 24, 1955) is a Canadian former professional ice hockey forward who played for the Montreal Canadiens, Washington Capitals and Hartford Whalers in the National Hockey League. He was a four-time Stanley Cup winner with the Canadiens.

Jarvis never missed a regular season game in his NHL career, which began on October 8, 1975, and ran until 1987; from 1986 until 2022, he held the NHL's longest-ever iron man streak. He previously served as an assistant coach for the Boston Bruins of the National Hockey League.  He is currently a senior advisor for the Vancouver Canucks.

Playing career
Jarvis began his hockey career with the Peterborough Petes in the OHA. He was a key player with the Petes as he took important faceoffs and strengthened their special teams unit. The Petes were selected to play as Team Canada in the 1974 World Junior Ice Hockey Championships, in what was first edition of the tournament was staged, and Jarvis was part of that team. Canada took home the bronze medal as Jarvis scored four goals in five games. After a 133-point effort in 1974–75, he was selected to the OMJHL First All-Star Team. This caught the attention of NHL scouts and in 1975, he was picked 24th overall by the Toronto Maple Leafs in the 1975 NHL Amateur Draft. However, he was traded almost right away to the Montreal Canadiens in exchange for Greg Hubick.

Jarvis began his professional hockey career in Montreal, winning a spot on the team as a 20-year-old rookie in 1975–76, playing every game that season. He remained there for seven years teaming up with Hall of Famer Bob Gainey to form one of the league's top penalty killing teams. He took home four Stanley Cups between 1976 and 1979. In 1980–81, Jarvis broke the 20-goal mark for the first time in his career.

In September 1982, Jarvis was traded to the Washington Capitals as part of a six-player blockbuster trade that sent him, Brian Engblom, Rod Langway and Craig Laughlin to Washington in exchange for Rick Green and Ryan Walter. He and his teammates from Montreal helped solidify the Caps defence and turned the Capitals into a Stanley Cup contender team. In 1983–84, Jarvis was awarded the Frank J. Selke Trophy for his outstanding two-way play. Halfway through the 1985–86 season, he was traded to the Hartford Whalers for Jorgen Pettersson. It was in Hartford that Doug Jarvis set the NHL record for most consecutive games played with 964, breaking Garry Unger's record of 914. For this achievement, he was awarded the Bill Masterton Memorial Trophy in 1986–87. Jarvis was eventually passed by Keith Yandle in the 2021–22 season.  In 1987–88, Jarvis was sent down to the minors as the Whalers were looking for Brent Peterson to take over as the team's top checking centre. He played in 24 games with the Binghamton Whalers before retiring.

Coaching career and front office career
Shortly after retiring, Jarvis was hired by the Minnesota North Stars to serve as assistant coach to Pierre Page. Two years later, the North Stars hired former linemate Bob Gainey as coach and general manager. The two helped the North Stars reach the Stanley Cup Finals in 1991 where they lost to the Pittsburgh Penguins. In 1993, the team was relocated to Dallas as the Dallas Stars. He stayed with the North Stars/Stars for 14 years where Dallas won their first Stanley Cup in franchise history in 1999. His 14-year tenure with the team makes it the longest period of time an assistant coach has stayed with the same team. He was an assistant coach with the Montreal Canadiens from 2005 until his dismissal in 2009 and coached the Canadiens farm team, the Hamilton Bulldogs, from 2003–2005. Jarvis also previously served as assistant coach to the Boston Bruins. He was hired by the Vancouver Canucks as an assistant coach during the 2016 offseason. He left his role after the 2017–18 season. He currently serves as a senior advisor for the Canucks.

Personal life
Jarvis and his wife Linda have two children, Landry and Laura. His cousin is Wes Jarvis.

Awards and achievements

 Selected to the OMJHL First All-Star Team in 1975.
 Frank J. Selke Trophy winner in 1984.
 Bill Masterton Memorial Trophy winner in 1987.
 Stanley Cup champion in 1976, 1977, 1978, 1979 (as player).
 Stanley Cup champion in 1999 and 2011 (as assistant coach).
 Formerly held NHL record for most consecutive games played (964).
Didn’t miss an NHL regular season game until he was a healthy scratch for game 3 of the 1987-88 season.

Career statistics

Regular season and playoffs

International

See also
Iron man

References

External links

1955 births
Living people
Bill Masterton Memorial Trophy winners
Binghamton Whalers players
Boston Bruins coaches
Canadian ice hockey centres
Dallas Stars coaches
Frank Selke Trophy winners
Hartford Whalers players
Houston Aeros draft picks
Ice hockey people from Ontario
Minnesota North Stars coaches
Montreal Canadiens coaches
Montreal Canadiens players
National Hockey League assistant coaches
Peterborough Petes (ice hockey) players
Sportspeople from Brantford
Stanley Cup champions
Toronto Maple Leafs draft picks
Vancouver Canucks coaches
Washington Capitals players
Canadian ice hockey coaches